Vas o No Vas is the Mexican version of Deal or No Deal, broadcast by Televisa. The original version was transmitted on Saturday nights, however episodes are now also broadcast on weekday evenings.  While the weekend version shows a more solemn environment (with a top prize of 5,000,000 pesos, about US$262,500),  the weekday version seems more informal and fun (with a top prize of 1,000,000 pesos, about US$52,500). Héctor Sandarti presents the show, and he has also done the Spanish-language American version (using the same title) for Telemundo.

Case values

Daily version 
Three cases contain non-monetary items. One has a value between $1 and $10, another between $10 and $50, and one more between $50 and $200.

Saturday Night version

The second version, called , was premiered in September 2009. It was hosted by Raúl Araiza Herrera. The top prize of the show is 2,500,000 pesos.

A contestant won only 1 peso after rejected the offer of 170,000 pesos. The other case had 350,000 pesos.

Mexican game shows
Deal or No Deal
Las Estrellas original programming
2005 Mexican television series debuts
Mexican television series based on Dutch television series
Television series by Banijay